Peridiniaceae is a family of dinoflagellates belonging to the order Peridiniales.

Genera
Peridiniaceae contains the following genera:

 Alterbia 
 Alterbidinium 
 Amphidiadema 
 Andalusiela 
 Apectodinium 
 Archaeosphaerodiniopsis 
 Arvalidinium 
 Ascodonium 
 Astrocysta 
 Axiodinium 
 Bohaidina 
 Bosedinia 
 Brigantedinium 
 Bulbodibium 
 Bysmatrum 
 Cachonina 
 Calciodinellum 
 Carinellum 
 Cepadinium 
 Cerodinium 
 Charlesdowniea 
 Chatangiella 
 Chateauneufacysta 
 Chichaouadinium 
 Colonsaydinium 
 Cooksoniella 
 Corculodinium 
 Craspedodinium 
 Cubiculosphaera 
 Diconodinium 
 Diniotorricellia 
 Dioxya 
 Dracodinium 
 Ensiculifera 
 Epelidosphaeridia 
 Eucladinium 
 Euperidinium 
 Eurydinium 
 Evittodinium 
 Fuetterella 
 Geiselodinium 
 Ginginodinium 
 Gippslandia 
 Glenodinium 
 Glochidinium 
 Gochtodinium 
 Godavariella 
 Halophilodinium 
 Heibergella 
 Hexagonifera 
 Holmwoodinium 
 Hwanghedinium 
 Indosphaera 
 Isabelidinium 
 Jinhudinium 
 Jusella 
 Kisselevia 
 Kryptoperidinium 
 Laciniadinium 
 Leberidocysta 
 Lebessphaera 
 Lentinia 
 Lithoperidinium 
 Luxadinium 
 Maduradinium 
 Manumiella 
 Messelodinium 
 Moria 
 Morkallacysta 
 Muiradinium 
 Muiriella 
 Nelsoniella 
 Nephrodinium 
 Niledziella 
 Ovoidinium 
 Palaeocystodinium 
 Palaeohystrichophora 
 Palaeoperidinium 
 Palatinus 
 Parabohaidina 
 Paraperidinium 
 Parvodinium 
 Pentagonum 
 Pentapharsodinium 
 Peridinium 
 Peridinopsis 
 Phthanoperidinium 
 Phyllodinium 
 Pierceites 
 Planoperidinium 
 Prominangularia 
 Pseudorhombodinium 
 Pyxidiella 
 Quinquecuspis 
 Rhabdothorax 
 Rhombodinium 
 Ripea 
 Saeptodinium 
 Satyrodinium 
 Scrippsiella 
 Senegalinium 
 Smolenskiella 
 Soaniella 
 Spinidinium 
 Subtilisphaera 
 Succiniperidinium 
 Sumatradinium 
 Svalbardella 
 Talimudinium 
 Talladinium 
 Teneridinium 
 Trinovantedinium 
 Trithyrodinium 
 Trivalvadinium 
 Uvatodinium 
 Vectidinium 
 Votadinium 
 Vozzhennikovia 
 Wetzeliella 
 Williamsidinium 
 Wilsonidium 
 Xandarodinium 
 Xenikoon 
 Xuidinium 
 Zhongyuandinium

References

Dinophyceae
Dinoflagellate families